Richard Clerke (by 1476–1530) was an English politician.

Educated in the law at Lincoln's Inn, by 1511 he had been appointed Recorder of Lincoln, a position he held until his death.

He was a Member (MP) of the Parliament of England for Lincoln in 1512, 1515 and 1523.

He was married with one daughter.

References

15th-century births
1530 deaths
Members of Lincoln's Inn
English MPs 1512–1514
English MPs 1515
English MPs 1523